Mordellochroa is a genus of tumbling flower beetles in the family Mordellidae. There are about nine described species in Mordellochroa.

Species
These nine species belong to the genus Mordellochroa:
 Mordellochroa abdominalis (Fabricius, 1775) g
 Mordellochroa hasegawai Nomura & Kato, 1959
 Mordellochroa humerosa (Rosenhauer, 1847) g
 Mordellochroa milleri (Emery, 1876) g
 Mordellochroa pulchella (Mulsant & Rey, 1859) g
 Mordellochroa scapularis (Say, 1824) i c g b (gold-shouldered mordellid)
 Mordellochroa shibatai Kiyoyama, 1987 g
 Mordellochroa taiwana Kiyoyama, 1987 g
 Mordellochroa tournieri (Emery, 1876) g
 Mordellochroa yanoi (Nomura, 1951) g
Data sources: i = ITIS, c = Catalogue of Life, g = GBIF, b = Bugguide.net

References

Further reading

External links

 

Mordellidae